Street Corner is a 1948 American exploitation film directed by Albert H. Kelley, produced by Wilshire Pictures, and featuring Johnny Duncan, Eddie Gribbon, and Marcia Mae Jones. It was released on DVD in 2003 by Something Weird Video.

Plot
Narrated to the viewing audience in flash back format by a sympathetic family doctor (after beginning with a trial in which an unnamed older woman is sentenced to 10 years in prison for an undisclosed  crime), the movie revolves around Lois Marsh, a high school girl who discovers that she is pregnant by her boyfriend, Bob Mason. Lois worries about her options. She and Bob decide to marry in secret, but Bob dies In a car accident on his way to meet Lois. Lois then confides in a waitress who directs her to a neighborhood abortion care provider.

After the abortion provider completes the procedure, Lois passes out on the street. She is immediately brought to her family doctor where she tells him what has happened. The doctor admits Lois to the hospital and informs her parents about the abortion. The movie concludes with the doctor giving a sex education lecture to teens and their parents using graphic, visual depictions of venereal disease, female anatomy, pregnancy, and childbirth.

Cast
Joseph Crehan as Dr. James Fenton
Marcia Mae Jones as Lois Marsh
Jean Fenwick as Mrs. Marsh
Don Brodie as Arnold Marsh
John Treul as Bob Mason
Billie Jean Eberhart as Irene (credited as Billie Jeanne Eberhart)
Jan Sutton as Kitty Mae
Gretl Dupont as The Abortionist
Jean Andren as Dr. Fenton's Nurse
Johnny Duncan as Hal (credited as John Duncan)
Sam Ash as District Attorney
Stuart Holmes as Judge
Wendell Niles as Wendell Niles
Michael Ross as Tom Brennan (credited as Milton Ross)
Dale Van Sickel as The Passing Motorist
Dandy Nichols as Mrs. Furness - Neighbour (uncredited)

Genre
This film, as with many exploitation films of the period, was influenced by the film Mom and Dad (1945).

References

External links
Street Corner at IMDB

1948 films
1948 drama films
Films about abortion
Films directed by Albert H. Kelley
American drama films
American black-and-white films
1940s American films